Gilbert Ray "Speck" Rhodes (born July 16, 1915, in West Plains, Missouri; died March 19, 2000) was a country music comedian and entertainer.

Rhodes was best known for his appearances on the Porter Wagoner television show. He came from a musical family; he and his two brothers and sister were known as Speck, Slim, Bea, and Dusty. In 1934 they were touring the RKO vaudeville circuit as the Log Cabin Mountaineers. Rhodes played banjo and bass fiddle and developed his comic character. In 1960 Speck auditioned for a new television show that Porter Wagoner was starting in Nashville. Having both come from West Plains, they had a natural chemistry, and Rhodes began an association with Wagoner that would last over 20 years.

Rhodes died March 19, 2000, at age 84 and is buried at Spring Hill Cemetery in Nashville, Tennessee.

External links
 Remembering Speck Rhodes, Clown Prince of Country Comedy
 

1915 births
2000 deaths
People from West Plains, Missouri
Country musicians from Missouri
Singers from Missouri
20th-century American singers